Asdiwal is a Native American mythological figure from the beliefs of the Tsimshian people, Indigenous peoples of the Pacific Northwest Coast. Franz Boas first wrote about the myth in an anthropological context.

References

Tsimshian mythology